Gilbart is an alternative spelling for Gilbert. It may refer to:

Andrew Gilbart (1950–2018), judge of the High Court of England and Wales
James William Gilbart (1794–1863), British, General Manager of the London and Westminster Bank

See also
Gilbert (disambiguation)
Gilbert (surname)